Bargrave is a surname. Notable people with the surname include:

Isaac Bargrave (1586–1643), English royalist churchman
John Bargrave, English author and collector